Chennai Superstars was one of the nine teams played in the defunct Indian Cricket League (ICL) founded in 2007. The team is based in Chennai, coached by Michael Bevan and captained by Stuart Law, both reputed Australian cricketers. 

The team had the distinction of winning the first two championships of Indian Cricket League, the ICL Inaugural T20 held in 2007 and the ICL 50 Overs Tournament held in 2008. They earned the third place in the third ICL tournament, ICL Edelweiss 20s held in 2008 and the runners place in ICL Domestic 20s 2008.

Etymology
The team is named after the popular movie star of Tamil Nadu, Rajnikanth who is popularly referred to as 'Superstar'.

Coaches and support staff
 Coach – Michael Bevan
 Assistant coach & Mentor – Kharsan Ghavri
 Physiotherapist – Anthony Smith
 Strength & Conditioning Coach – Corey Bocking
 Massage-therapist – Julia Russel, Flavier Lia

Players
Overseas Players
Ian Harvey (Australia)
Stuart Law (Australia) (Captain)
Nantie Hayward (South Africa)
Russel Arnold (Sri Lanka)
Shabbir Ahmed (Pakistan)

Local Players
 R Sathish (Chennai) (Vice Captain)
 Hemang Badani (Chennai)
 G Vignesh (Chennai)
 Tamil Kumaran (Chennai)
 Hemanth Kumar (Chennai)
 Syed Mohammed (Chennai)
 Thiru Kumaran (Chennai)
 J. Hareish (Chennai)
 Vasanth Sarvanan (Tamil Nadu)
 Rajamani Jesuraj (Tamil Nadu)
 Vasudevan Devendran (Chennai)
 Vivek Parikh (Gujarat)

Previous performance

Trivia

 Sanjeev Martin (Tamil Nadu) and Sridharan Sriram (Chennai) who played for Chennai Superstars in ICL 50s in 2008 season joined the Ahmedabad Rockets from the Edelweiss T20s in 2008 season.
 Chris Read (England) who played for Chennai Superstars in 2007 season was replaced by Adam Parore (New Zealand) from the Edelweiss T20s in 2008 season who was in turn replaced by Nantie Hayward (South Africa) in 2008–2009 season.
 R.Sathish, G.Vignesh, J.Syed Mohammed and Thiru Kumaran played for ICL India in the 2008 Indian Cricket League World Series. Shabbir Ahmed represented ICL Pakistan while Russel Arnold and Ian Harvey represented ICL World in the same tournament.
 Coach Michael Bevan played three matches for the side in the ICL Edelweiss 20s held in 2008
 Chennai Superstars have been placed in the top 10 of Bartercard Power Rankings for T20 teams

Notes 

Indian Cricket League teams
Cricket clubs established in 2007
Cricket in Chennai
Former senior cricket clubs of India
2007 establishments in Tamil Nadu